No Matter is a collaborative album by Kudsi Erguner, Bill Laswell, Mark Nauseef and Markus Stockhausen. It was released on August 19, 2008 by Metastation.

Track listing

Personnel 
Adapted from the No Matter liner notes.
Musicians
Kudsi Erguner – ney
Bill Laswell – fretless bass guitar, sitar, effects, mixing
Mark Nauseef – bells, gong
Markus Stockhausen – flugelhorn, trumpet
Technical personnel
John Brown – cover art, design
James Dellatacoma – assistant engineer
Michael Fossenkemper – mastering
Robert Musso – engineering
Walter Quintus – engineering, producer
Kurt Renker – producer

Release history

References

External links 
 
 No Matter at Bandcamp

2008 albums
Collaborative albums
Bill Laswell albums